The 1996 Cheltenham Council election took place on 2 May 1996 to elect members of Cheltenham Borough Council in Gloucestershire, England. One third of the council was up for election and the Liberal Democrats stayed in overall control of the council. After failing to hold a single seat in either 1994 or 1996, the Conservatives avoided wipeout by holding three seats.

After the election, the composition of the council was
Liberal Democrat 34
Conservative 3
People Against Bureaucracy 3
Labour 1

Election result

Ward results

References

Cheltenham
Cheltenham Borough Council elections